Cacia estrellae is a species of beetle in the family Cerambycidae. It was described by Karl-Ernst Hüdepohl in 1989. It is known from the Philippines.

References

Cacia (beetle)
Beetles described in 1989